Domestic Troubles is a lost 1928 American comedy film directed by Ray Enright and starring Clyde Cook, Louise Fazenda and Betty Blythe. It was produced and released by Warner Brothers with a Vitaphone musical track.

Cast
 Clyde Cook as James Bullard / Horace Bullard  
 Louise Fazenda as Lola  
 Betty Blythe as Carrie  
 Jean Lefferty as Grace  
 Arthur Rankin as Meredith Roberts

Preservation status
The film is now lost.

See also
List of early Warner Bros. sound and talking features

References

Bibliography
 Roy Liebman. Vitaphone Films: A Catalogue of the Features and Shorts. McFarland, 2003.

External links

1928 films
1928 comedy films
Silent American comedy films
Films directed by Ray Enright
1920s English-language films
American black-and-white films
Warner Bros. films
American silent feature films
Lost American films
1928 lost films
Lost comedy films
1920s American films